Ajylu (anglicized: Achaghu) is a village in Syunik Province, Armenia. It is located about 4km south of Kuchuma. The village had an Azerbaijani-majority population before their exodus in 1968-69.

References

External links 

Populated places in Syunik Province